Coulrophobia & Fata Morgana (2016) is the fifth collection of short stories by American author Jacob M. Appel. Like his previous collection, Miracles and Conundrums of the Secondary Planets, it was published by Black Lawrence. Coulrophobia & Fata Morgana was released in September 2016.

Reception

In the Amsterdam Quarterly, Bryan R. Monte describes Appel as "one of American’s best short story writers" and that "Coulrophobia & Fata Morgana merely confirms this reputation". Striking13 backs up this opinion, saying that Appel has "mastered the underappreciated craft of short-form storytelling". Valerie Wieland of New Pages wrote of the collection that "All the stories are entertaining" and that Appel "appears to never stop writing, and that’s a good thing for readers."

Contents
 The Butcher’s Music
 The Punishment
 Pollen
 Boundaries
 Coulrophobia
 Saluting the Magpie
 Fata Morgana
 Hearth and Home
 Counting
 Silent Theology

References

American short story collections
2016 short story collections